Cynthia Lynne Axne (née Wadle; born April 20, 1965) is an American politician who served as the U.S. representative from Iowa's 3rd congressional district from 2019 until 2023. A member of the Democratic Party, she narrowly defeated incumbent Republican David Young in the 2018 elections. The district was anchored in the state capital Des Moines; it included much of the state's southwest quadrant, including Council Bluffs. 

Axne ran for reelection in 2022 but lost to Republican challenger Zach Nunn, a U.S. Air Force officer.

Early life and career
Axne was born in Grand Rapids, Michigan, in 1965, the daughter of Terry and Joanne Wadle. She graduated from Valley High School in West Des Moines, Iowa. She earned a bachelor's degree in journalism from the University of Iowa and a Master of Business Administration from Northwestern University.

After graduating from college, Axne worked in leadership development and strategic planning for the Tribune Company in Chicago. From 2005 to 2014, she worked in the Iowa state government on service delivery in over 20 state agencies in the executive branch.

U.S. House of Representatives

Elections

2018 

In 2018, Axne ran for the United States House of Representatives in Iowa's 3rd congressional district. She won the Democratic primary election with 57.91% of the vote and defeated incumbent Representative David Young in the general election, becoming, with Abby Finkenauer, one of the first two women from Iowa elected to the House. Young carried 15 of the district's 16 counties, but Axne won Polk County, the district's most populous county and home to Des Moines, by over 30,000 votes, far exceeding the overall margin of 8,000.

2020 

In 2020, Axne won the Democratic primary virtually unopposed, facing only write-in candidates. She then defeated David Young in a rematch in the general election, with 48.9% of the vote to Young's 47.6%.

2022 

Axne ran for reelection and lost to Republican nominee Zach Nunn by a margin of 0.7%.

Tenure 
Axne took office during the 2018–2019 United States federal government shutdown and requested that her pay be withheld until the shutdown ended. On January 30, 2019, she co-sponsored a bill, the Shutdown to End All Shutdowns (SEAS) Act, to prevent future federal government shutdowns from happening.

In September 2021, Axne was accused of failing to disclose up to $645,000 in stock trades. Reports also found that she had bought and sold stocks in companies she was tasked to oversee as a member of the House Financial Services Committee.

In July 2022, The Committee on Ethics voted to clear Axne of any wrongdoing and dismissed previously filed complaints on stock trading.

In September 2022, Axne voted for the Inflation Reduction Act by proxy while on vacation in France.

As of October 2022, Axne has voted in line with Joe Biden's stated position 100% of the time. In an October 2022 interview, she called Biden the "the most impactful president we've seen in this country’s history".

In 2022, Axne voted for H.R. 1808: Assault Weapons Ban of 2022.

Committee assignments
 United States House Committee on Agriculture
 Subcommittee on Commodity Exchanges, Energy, and Credit
 Subcommittee on Conservation and Forestry
 United States House Committee on Financial Services
 Subcommittee on Housing, Community Development and Insurance
 Subcommittee on Investor Protection, Entrepreneurship and Capital Markets

Caucus memberships 
New Democrat Coalition

Electoral history

'''

Personal life 
Axne and her husband, John, operate a digital design firm. They have two sons and live in West Des Moines. They are members of Sacred Heart Catholic Church in West Des Moines.

See also

 Women in the United States House of Representatives

References

External links

|-

1965 births
21st-century American politicians
21st-century American women politicians
21st-century Roman Catholics
Candidates in the 2018 United States elections
Catholics from Iowa
Catholics from Michigan
Catholic politicians from Iowa
Democratic Party members of the United States House of Representatives from Iowa
Female members of the United States House of Representatives
Kellogg School of Management alumni
Living people
People from West Des Moines, Iowa
Politicians from Grand Rapids, Michigan
University of Iowa alumni